Clay Johnson lll (born July 18, 1956) is an American former professional basketball player from Yazoo City, Mississippi.

A 6'4" shooting guard from the University of Missouri, Johnson played three seasons (1981–1984) in the National Basketball Association (NBA) as a member of the Los Angeles Lakers and Seattle SuperSonics.  He averaged 2.8 points per game in his NBA career and won an NBA championship with the Lakers in 1982.

Johnson played in 65 games spread over two seasons with the Lakers and was a member of the 1982 NBA championship team, appearing in seven playoff games. Johnson also played 192 games in the Continental Basketball Association CBA, averaging 16.7 points and 4.6 rebounds for the Billings Volcanos, Sarasota Stingers, Evansville Thunder and Kansas City Sizzlers from 1979 to 1986.

References

External links

1956 births
Living people
American men's basketball players
Basketball players from Missouri
Billings Volcanos players
Evansville Thunder players
Hawaii Volcanos players
Junior college men's basketball players in the United States
Kansas City Sizzlers players
Los Angeles Lakers players
Missouri Tigers men's basketball players
People from Yazoo City, Mississippi
Portland Trail Blazers draft picks
Sarasota Stingers players
Seattle SuperSonics players
Shooting guards